The city of Fall River, Massachusetts once had over 120 cotton textile mills and was the leading cotton textile center in the United States during the late 19th century and early 20th century.
There are currently about 65 historic textile mills remaining in the city, as well as other related structures. Many have been added to the National Register of Historic Places.

Existing historic textile mills

Other existing historic manufacturing mills

Other existing notable mill related structures

Non-extant mills

See also
History of Fall River, Massachusetts
List of mills in New Bedford, Massachusetts
List of Registered Historic Places in Fall River, Massachusetts
List of mills in Holyoke, Massachusetts
List of mills in Oldham

References

-

History of Massachusetts

Fall River
Mills Fall River